Định Bình Lake is a large artificial freshwater lake in Vĩnh Thạnh District, Bình Định Province, Vietnam. Work began creating the dam on Côn River in May 2003. It has a capacity of 226 million cubic metres. The lake and dam are expected to provide irrigation for some 12,545 hectares (over 48 square miles).

References 

Lakes of Vietnam
Landforms of Bình Định province